In mathematics, an alternating group is the group of even permutations of a finite set.

Basic properties 
For , the group An is the commutator subgroup of the symmetric group Sn with index 2 and has therefore n!/2 elements. It is the kernel of the signature group homomorphism  explained under symmetric group.

A5 is the smallest non-abelian simple group, having order 60, and the smallest non-solvable group.

The group A4 has the Klein four-group V as a proper normal subgroup, namely the identity and the double transpositions , that is the kernel of the surjection of A4 onto . We have the exact sequence . In Galois theory, this map, or rather the corresponding map , corresponds to associating the Lagrange resolvent cubic to a quartic, which allows the quartic polynomial to be solved by radicals, as established by Lodovico Ferrari.

Conjugacy classes 
As in the symmetric group, any two elements of An that are conjugate by an element of  An must have the same cycle shape. The converse is not necessarily true, however. If the cycle shape consists only of cycles of odd length with no two cycles the same length, where cycles of length one are included in the cycle type, then there are exactly two conjugacy classes for this cycle shape .

Examples:
The two permutations (123) and (132) are not conjugates in A3, although they have the same cycle shape, and are therefore conjugate in S3.
The permutation (123)(45678) is not conjugate to its inverse (132)(48765) in A8, although the two permutations have the same cycle shape, so they are conjugate in S8.

Relation with symmetric group 
See  Symmetric group.
As finite symmetric groups are the groups of all permutations of a set with finite elements, and the alternating groups are groups of even permutations, alternating groups are subgroups of finite symmetric groups.

Generators and relations 
For n ≥ 3, An is generated by 3-cycles, since 3-cycles can be obtained by combining pairs of transpositions.

Automorphism group 

For  and 2, the automorphism group is trivial. For  the automorphism group is Z2, with trivial inner automorphism group and outer automorphism group Z2.

The outer automorphism group of A6 is the Klein four-group , and is related to the outer automorphism of S6. The extra outer automorphism in A6 swaps the 3-cycles (like (123)) with elements of shape 32 (like ).

Exceptional isomorphisms 
There are some exceptional isomorphisms between some of the small alternating groups and small groups of Lie type, particularly projective special linear groups. These are:
 A4 is isomorphic to PSL2(3) and the symmetry group of chiral tetrahedral symmetry.
 A5 is isomorphic to PSL2(4), PSL2(5), and the symmetry group of chiral icosahedral symmetry. (See  for an indirect isomorphism of  using a classification of simple groups of order 60, and here for a direct proof).
 A6 is isomorphic to PSL2(9) and PSp4(2)'.
 A8 is isomorphic to PSL4(2).

More obviously, A3 is isomorphic to the cyclic group Z3, and A0, A1, and A2 are isomorphic to the trivial group (which is also  for any q).

Examples S4 and A4

Example A5 as a subgroup of 3-space rotations 

A5 is the group of isometries of a dodecahedron in 3-space, so there is a representation .

In this picture the vertices of the polyhedra represent the elements of the group, with the center of the sphere representing the identity element. Each vertex represents a rotation about the axis pointing from the center to that vertex, by an angle equal to the distance from the origin, in radians. Vertices in the same polyhedron are in the same conjugacy class.

The vertices of each polyhedron are in bijective correspondence with the elements of its conjugacy class, with the exception of the conjugacy class of (2,2)-cycles, which is represented by an icosidodecahedron on the outer surface, with its antipodal vertices identified with each other. The reason for this redundancy is that the corresponding rotations are by  radians, and so can be represented by a vector of length  in either of two directions. Thus the class of (2,2)-cycles contains 15 elements, while the icosidodecahedron has 30 vertices.

The two conjugacy classes of twelve 5-cycles in A5 are represented by two icosahedra, of radii 2/5 and 4/5, respectively. The nontrivial outer automorphism in  interchanges these two classes and the corresponding icosahedra.

Example: the 15 puzzle

It can be proved that the 15 puzzle, a famous example of the sliding puzzle, can be represented by the alternating group A15, because the combinations of the 15 puzzle can be generated by 3-cycles. In fact, any  sliding puzzle with square tiles of equal size can be represented by A2k−1.

Subgroups
A subgroup of three elements (generated by a cyclic rotation of three objects) with any distinct nontrivial element generates the whole group.

For all , An has no nontrivial (that is, proper) normal subgroups. Thus, An is a simple group for all . A5 is the smallest non-solvable group.

Group homology

The group homology of the alternating groups exhibits stabilization, as in stable homotopy theory: for sufficiently large n, it is constant. However, there are some low-dimensional exceptional homology. Note that the homology of the symmetric group exhibits similar stabilization, but without the low-dimensional exceptions (additional homology elements).

H1: Abelianization 
The first homology group coincides with abelianization, and (since An is perfect, except for the cited exceptions) is thus:
H1(An, Z) = Z1 for n = 0, 1, 2;
H1(A3, Z) = A = A3 = Z3;
H1(A4, Z) = A = Z3;
H1(An, Z) = Z1 for n ≥ 5.

This is easily seen directly, as follows. An is generated by 3-cycles – so the only non-trivial abelianization maps are  since order-3 elements must map to order-3 elements – and for  all 3-cycles are conjugate, so they must map to the same element in the abelianization, since conjugation is trivial in abelian groups. Thus a 3-cycle like (123) must map to the same element as its inverse (321), but thus must map to the identity, as it must then have order dividing 2 and 3, so the abelianization is trivial.

For , An is trivial, and thus has trivial abelianization.

H2: Schur multipliers 

The Schur multipliers of the alternating groups An (in the case where n is at least 5) are the cyclic groups of order 2, except in the case where n is either 6 or 7, in which case there is also a triple cover. In these cases, then, the Schur multiplier is (the cyclic group) of order 6.

H2(An, Z) = Z1 for n = 1, 2, 3;
H2(An, Z) = Z2 for n = 4, 5;
H2(An, Z) = Z6 for n = 6, 7;
H2(An, Z) = Z2 for n ≥ 8.

Notes

References

External links
 
 

Finite groups
Permutation groups